A list of people, who died during the 19th century, who have received recognition as Blessed (through beatification) or Saint (through canonization) from the Catholic Church:

See also 

Christianity in the 19th century

19
 Christian saints
19th-century venerated Christians
Lists of 19th-century people